East Cliff Church is a Grade II listed United Reformed church in East Cliff Bournemouth, Dorset, England.

History 
The church was completed in 1879 and was listed in 1987.

Gallery

References

See also 

 List of churches in Bournemouth

1879 establishments in England
Churches completed in 1879
Churches in Bournemouth
Grade II listed churches in Dorset
United Reformed churches in England
Gothic Revival architecture in Dorset